Chesaw is an unincorporated community in Okanogan County, Washington.

Chesaw was named for the Chinese settler Chee Saw, who arrived in the mid-1890s and married a Native American woman.  The town sprang up and thrived during a brief gold rush from 1896 to 1900. Chesaw now hosts an annual rodeo held every .

Notes and references

Ghost towns in Washington (state)
Geography of Okanogan County, Washington
Mining communities in Washington (state)